The 2006 Acura Classic was a women's tennis tournament played on outdoor hard courts in San Diego in the United States which was part of Tier I of the 2006 WTA Tour. It was the 28th edition of the tournament and was held from July 29 through August 6, 2006. Second-seeded Maria Sharapova won the singles title and earned $196,900 first-prize money as well as 300 ranking points.

Finals

Singles

 Maria Sharapova defeated  Kim Clijsters, 7–5, 7–5
It was Sharapova's 2nd title of the year and the 12th of her career.

Doubles

 Cara Black /  Rennae Stubbs defeated  Anna-Lena Grönefeld /  Meghann Shaughnessy, 6–2, 6–2
It was Black's 1st title of the year and the 36th of her career. It was Stubbs' 2nd title of the year and the 54th of her career.

External links 

 ITF tournament edition details
 Tournament draws

Acura Classic
Acura Classic
Southern California Open
Acura Classic
Acura Classic
Acura Classic
Acura Classic